Osceola is an unincorporated community in western Kingsbury County, in the U.S. state of South Dakota. The community is located on the South Fork Pearl River and is approximately six miles southwest of Bancroft.

History
A post office called Osceola was established in 1888, and remained in operation until 1960. The community takes its name after Osceola, Iowa, the native home of a share of the early settlers.

References

Unincorporated communities in Kingsbury County, South Dakota
Unincorporated communities in South Dakota
1888 establishments in Dakota Territory